Delišimunović is a branch of the Radojćić family. They are a Croatian noble family originating from the Klis Fortress where they were Uskoks. Members of the family served on the military border of the Austro Hungarian Empire.

History

The Delišimunović are a noble branch of the Radojčić family. The family name was recorded in documents in the forms Delisimonovich, Dellisimunovich, Delljsimonovich and Dellissimunovich. The surname was created by the nickname Delišimun (delija Šimun) carried by Ivan Radojčić's son, Šimun. The name was created around 1530–37. The family lived in the Klis Fortress, they then moved from Klis to Pokuplje. There they owned the property of Radojcic castle near Duge Rese. Soon they moved to Zumberak where Krsto Delisimunovic was awarded the title of Baron on August 9, 1675 by Leopold I, his son Franjo Krsto Delisimunovic was awarded the title of Count in 1708. Male members of the family served in the military, Krsto Delišimunović was lieutenant general of Karlovac. The family owned property in Zumberak including Zumberak Castle, Radojcic castle, Kostanjevac and Petricko Selo. The family also owned several southern estates such as Brlog, Paraduš, Dreznik and Trešćeni

See also 

Croatian nobility
List of noble families of Croatia

Sources

Delišimunović